Bad food may refer to:

 Food poisoning, food that is contaminated and causes sickness when eaten
 Junk food, food that is not very nutritious and causes dietary health problems